Forchlorfenuron is a plant growth regulator. It has been approved for use on kiwifruit and grapes in the United States, and it has been associated with news of watermelons exploding in  China.

References

External links
 Forchlorfenuron at PubChem
 Forchlorfenuron Petition and Response at the EPA Pesticide Registry

Plant growth regulators
Chloropyridines